Sarah Ennis (born 13 March 1975) is an Irish eventing rider. Representing Ireland, she has competed at two editions of World Equestrian Games (in 2014 and 2018). Her best achievements came at the 2018 edition of the Games, held in Tryon, North Carolina, where she won a silver medal with an Irish team and placed 5th individually.

Ennis has also competed at two European Chamopionships. Her best achievements at the European level came in 2017, when she placed 4th with an Irish team and achieved 7th place individually.

CCI 4* Results

References

External links
 
 
 
 

1975 births
Living people
Irish female equestrians
Equestrians at the 2020 Summer Olympics
Olympic equestrians of Ireland
20th-century Irish women
21st-century Irish women